The Supreme Audit Institution of Antigua and Barbuda, co-officially known as the Office of the Director of Audit is the supreme audit institution of Antigua and Barbuda, and as such, assists the Parliament in holding the government accountable in management of the country's finances and operations. The institution describes itself as "an independent, constitutionally established office that exists to serve Parliament."

History 
The responsibilities of the Supreme Audit Institution are outlined in the Office of the Director of Audit Act, 2014.

Director of Audit

International cooperation 
Director of Audit, Dean Evanston, was elected in December 2019 to be a member of the External Board of Auditors of the OAS.

References

External links 

 Supreme Audit Institution 

Government of Antigua and Barbuda